Neil O'Donnell (21 December 1949 – May 2022) was a Scottish professional footballer who played as a midfielder.

Career
O'Donnell was born in Glasgow, Lanarkshire, Scotland. He began his career with Norwich City, for whom he made 64 appearances (scoring three goals) and was a member of the club's squad that won the second division championship in 1972. After leaving Carrow Road in 1974, O'Donnell played for Gillingham and Sheffield Wednesday. He retired due to injury after the 1976–77 season, and played for Sheffield Wednesday in a testimonial match against Norwich.

O'Donnell's death was announced on 26 May 2022.

Honours
Second Division Championship 1971–72

Notes

References

1949 births
2022 deaths
Scottish footballers
Footballers from Glasgow
Association football midfielders
English Football League players
Norwich City F.C. players
Gillingham F.C. players
Sheffield Wednesday F.C. players